Heizō, Heizo or Heizou (written:  or ) is a masculine Japanese given name. Notable people with the name include:

, Japanese painter
, Japanese economist and politician

Japanese masculine given names